Evans Bobie Opoku is a Ghanaian politician and member of the Seventh Parliament and Eighth Parliament of the Fourth Republic of Ghana representing the Asunafo North Constituency in the Ahafo Region on the ticket of the New Patriotic Party. In 2021, Nana Akufo-Addo appointed and sworn in him as the Deputy Minister for Youth and Sports.

Early life and education 
Evans Bobie Opoku was born on 1 December 1974 and hails from Dadiesoaba in the Ahafo region. He completed his BECE in 1990 and his SSSCE in 1993. He further had his GCE in 1996. He later obtained his diploma in Adult education from the University of Ghana in 2002. He further had his bachelor's degree in Social work  and Psychology in 2008. In 2012, he had his master's degree in Development Management from the University of Cape Coast and in 2020, he had his LLB in Law.

Career 
Evans was the General manager from 2010 to 2016 and also the Credit manager for the Ahafo Community Bank Limited from 2002 to 2006. He was a tutor from 1997 to 1999.

Political career 
Evans is a member of NPP and currently the MP for the Asunafo North Constituency in the Ahafo region. In the 2020 Ghana general elections, he won the parliamentary seat with 34,684 votes whilst the NDC parliamentary aspirant Mohammed Haruna had 31,340 votes. He was formerly the Regional Minister for the Bono Ahafo region and the Regional minister for the Ahafo region. He was appointed as the deputy minister for Youth and sports. He was also appointed the care-taker as regional minister for the Bono-East region.

Committees 
Evans is a member of the Government Assurance committee and also a member of Environment, Science and Technology Committee.

Personal life 
Evans is a Christian.

Philanthropy 
In 2020, Evans presented veronica buckets, soaps and other items to the people of the Asunafo North Constituency during the COVID-19 pandemic.

References

Ghanaian MPs 2017–2021
1974 births
Living people
New Patriotic Party politicians
Ghanaian MPs 2021–2025
People from Ahafo Region